Liang Wengen (born 1956) is a Chinese entrepreneur who founded and serves as the chairman of Sany Heavy Industry. In 2011, he became the richest man in mainland China with a net worth of about USD 8 billion. As of November 2018, he is the 68th richest person in China, with a net worth of about $3.5 billion.

Biography
He was born to a poor peasant family in Maotang, a small town in Lianyuan, Loudi, Hunan province in 1956.

Liang worked as a top manager at a state arms plant, before getting involved in the construction-equipment industry. He is the founder and main shareholder of Sany Group, a heavy industry manufacturer based in Changsha, Hunan.

Personal life
Liang has a bachelor's degree from Central South University. He is married and has one son, Liang Zhizhong. He lives in Changsha.

References

External links
 Baike.com 梁稳根 

1956 births
Living people
Chinese billionaires
Sany
Businesspeople from Hunan
People from Loudi
Central South University alumni
Chinese company founders